"Complicated" is a song by Canadian singer-songwriter Avril Lavigne from her debut album, Let Go (2002). The ballad was released as her debut single and the lead single from the album on 11 March 2002 by Arista Records. Lavigne and production team the Matrix (Lauren Christy, Scott Spock, and Graham Edwards) are credited as writers. Production on the song was helmed by the Matrix. According to Lavigne, the song is about being honest with oneself rather than "putting on a face".

"Complicated" received positive reviews from music critics, who praised the song as infectious pop rock. "Complicated" peaked at number two on the Billboard Hot 100, ultimately selling 1.1 million copies in the US. The song also spent a consecutive sixteen weeks at number one on the Billboard Adult Top 40 chart, breaking a previous record held by Natalie Imbruglia's "Torn". Internationally, "Complicated" topped the charts in Australia, Ireland, New Zealand, and Norway, with the song peaking in the top five in over twenty countries. "Complicated" was nominated for two Grammy Awards for Song of the Year and Best Female Pop Vocal Performance.

Background and release
After being signed to Arista Records, Lavigne moved to New York and began working on her debut album, Let Go, collaborating with a host of prime songwriters and producers. For a year, nothing was working for Lavigne and was on the verge of getting dropped off Arista. The management pitched her songs written by other songwriters, but she declined, insisting she wanted to write songs herself. Lavigne relocated to Los Angeles, where she collaborated with songwriter-producer Clif Magness, who gave her ample creative control in the writing process. Lavigne and Magness wrote "Losing Grip" and "Unwanted", songs that she deemed reflective of her vision for the entire album. However, Arista was not thrilled with the heavy-guitar laden songs that Lavigne was writing, prompting the label to look for other producers to match their demands.

Lavigne came to the attention of the three-piece production team the Matrix. Arista could not find the right direction for Lavigne, so the team's manager, Sandy Roberton, suggested that they work together. According to member Lauren Christy, they had been listening to Lavigne's early songs and felt they contained "a Faith Hill kind of vibe". As soon as they saw Lavigne coming into their studio, the Matrix felt that her musical direction was incongruous to her image and attitude. After talking to Lavigne for an hour, the singer said she wanted songs with punk rock inclinations. They told her to come back the following day, and in the afternoon during that day, they wrote a song that evolved into "Complicated" and another song called "Falling Down". They played it to Lavigne, inspiring her musical path.

When Josh Sarubin, the A&R executive who signed Lavigne to the imprint, heard the song, he knew it was right for her. Lavigne presented the song to Reid, who agreed the musical direction Lavigne and the Matrix were taking, and set "Complicated" as the album's lead single.

Composition
Composed in the key of F major, "Complicated" is a pop rock song about how people can feign or pretend in front of others. Lavigne said about the song: "People sometimes bother me how they're not real and how they're just, like, putting on a face and being two-faced". Lavigne stated that she experienced this with both boyfriends and female friends.

Critical reception
The song received generally positive reviews from critics. In 2009, Rolling Stone readers voted "Complicated" as the eighth Top single of the decade. "Complicated" also ranked at number 197 in Blender magazine's "The 500 Greatest Songs Since You Were Born". In an AOL Radio listener's poll, "Complicated" was voted Lavigne's sixth best song.

David Browne of Entertainment Weekly gave the song a B- and said "Avril Lavigne's not kidding about that title, she's the epitome of the blossoming anti-Britney movement". Christina Saraceno of AllMusic described "Complicated" as "a gem of a pop/rock tune with a killer chorus" and noted similarities between it and the Pink's song "Don't Let Me Get Me". Saraceno highlighted the song as a "track pick" in a review of the album, Let Go.

On a more negative note, Sal Cinquemani of Slant magazine described 'Complicated' as "infectious" and "more poser than punk". In a review of Lavigne's second album, Under My Skin, David Browne of Entertainment Weekly noted that "Complicated felt like strung-together bits of Morissette songs".

Commercial performance
"Complicated" peaked at number two on the US Billboard Hot 100 and stayed for 31 weeks on the chart, It was Lavigne's longest charting song on the chart. "Complicated" peaked at number one on the US Billboard Adult Top 40 Airplay chart and on the US Mainstream Top 40 Airplay chart, number 13 on the US Adult Contemporary, and number 30 on the US Rhythmic (Billboard). The single was certified 3× Platinum in the United States with 3 million copies sold, making it the best selling debut single by a Female Canadian singer. Billboard ranked it at number 83 of the 'Top 100 Singles of the Decade'.

In the United Kingdom, "Complicated" peaked at number three on the UK Singles Chart and was certified Platinum with more than 885,000 copies sold. In Canada, the single peaked at number 21 on the Canadian Singles Chart and was the fourth-most-played song on Canadian radio in 2002, as well as the most-played song of the year by a native artist. In New Zealand, the single peaked at number one for 9 consecutive weeks on the RIANZ Singles Chart and was certified Platinum with 10,000 copies sold. "Complicated" also peaked and debuted at number one in Australia, Ireland, and Norway; number two in Austria, Denmark, Europe, Hungary, Netherlands, Scotland, Sweden, Switzerland; and number three in Belgium, Germany, and Poland. It was certified 2× Platinum in Australia with 140,000 copies sold, and Gold in Denmark with 45,000 copies sold. "Complicated" was certified Gold in Austria, Belgium, Italy, Japan, Sweden, and Switzerland and Platinum in Brazil and Norway.

Music video

The video, directed by the Malloys, starts with Lavigne asking her bandmates if they want to "crash" the mall. They respond with enthusiasm, and skateboard there. The video features Lavigne and the band harassing shoppers and employees, generally causing havoc around the mall; for example, Lavigne watches her bandmates try on humorous clothing which is fittingly shown as Lavigne sings the line "You come over unannounced, dressed up like you're something else".

This is intercut with footage of Lavigne performing the song at a skatepark while playing the guitar, with her band performing with her. People can be seen skateboarding around Lavigne as she and her band perform the song. As the line "You fall and you crawl..." is sung, a skateboarder can be seen falling over.

The video was shot at Eagle Rock Plaza, Los Angeles, in two days. During the shooting, the mall remained open. The video for "Complicated" was shot March 4–5, 2002 in L.A. The music video was released in April 2002.

As of May 2022, the video has over 500 million views on YouTube.

The music video was ranked at number 41 on Billboards 100 Greatest Music Videos of the 21st Century.

Accolades
Lavigne won Best New Artist in a Video at the 2002 MTV Video Music Awards for "Complicated". "Complicated" won in the Single of the Year category at the 2003 Juno Awards. In the United States, the song was nominated at the 2003 Grammy Awards for Best Female Pop Vocal Performance and Song of the Year; it lost both awards to Norah Jones's "Don't Know Why". In Brazil, it was nominated in the category of best international video at the 2003 MTV Video Music Brazil. In April 2020, Billboard ranked the track at number two on their list of "The 50 Greatest Minivan Rock Songs".

Track listings and formats

 US CD single and 7-inch vinyl
 "Complicated" (Tom Lord-Alge mix) – 4:05
 "Complicated" (the Matrix mix) – 4:02

 European CD single
 "Complicated" (Tom Lord-Alge mix) – 4:08
 "I Don't Give"  – 3:39

 Italian and Japanese CD single
 "Complicated" (The Matrix mix) – 4:03
 "I Don't Give"  – 3:39

 UK cassette and European maxi-single 1
 "Complicated" (Tom Lord-Alge mix) – 4:08
 "I Don't Give"  – 3:39
 "Why"  – 3:59
 "Complicated" (video) 

Australian maxi-single and European maxi-single 2
 "Complicated" (The Matrix mix) – 4:03
 "I Don't Give"  – 3:39
 "Why"  – 3:59
 "Complicated" (video)

Credits and personnel
Credits and personnel are adapted from the "Complicated" CD single liner notes.
 Avril Lavigne – writer, lead vocals
 The Matrix – writer, producer, arrangement, recording, background vocals
 Tom Lord-Alge – mixing at South Beach Studios (Miami)
 Corky James – guitar
 Victor Indrizzo – drums

Charts

Weekly charts

Year-end charts

Decade-end charts

All-time charts

Certifications and sales

Release history

See also
 "A Complicated Song", parody by "Weird Al" Yankovic

References

2002 debut singles
2002 singles
Arista Records singles
Avril Lavigne songs
Irish Singles Chart number-one singles
Juno Award for Single of the Year singles
Music videos directed by The Malloys
Number-one singles in Australia
Number-one singles in New Zealand
Number-one singles in Norway
Record Report Pop Rock General number-one singles
Song recordings produced by the Matrix (production team)
Songs containing the I–V-vi-IV progression
Songs written by Avril Lavigne
Songs written by Graham Edwards (musician)
Songs written by Lauren Christy
Songs written by Scott Spock